David Martins (born 16 September 1930) is a Guyanese cricketer. He played in one first-class match for British Guiana in 1953/54.

See also
 List of Guyanese representative cricketers

References

External links
 

1930 births
Living people
Guyanese cricketers
Guyana cricketers
Sportspeople from Georgetown, Guyana